MECHATROLINK is an open protocol used for industrial automation, originally developed by Yaskawa and presently maintained by Mechatrolink Members Association (MMA).

Mechatrolink protocol has two major variants:
 MECHATROLINK-II—Defines protocol communication schemes through serial link equivalent to RS485 with a maximum speed of 10Mbit/s and maximum 30 slave nodes.
 MECHATROLINK-III—Defines protocol communication schemes over Ethernet with a maximum speed of 100Mbit/s and maximum 62 slave nodes.

References

External links
 Protocol Introduction and Supported Products

Industrial computing
Serial buses
Industrial Ethernet